The Royal University of Agriculture (RUA) is a leading public agricultural university in Cambodia. It is located in Dangkao Section, southwest Phnom Penh. The university is operated by the Ministry of Agriculture, Forestry and Fisheries.

History
In 1964, the Royal University of Agronomy Science was found by then Prince Norodom Sihanouk. It was one of the nine royal universities established to improve Cambodian higher education development. Unfortunately, it was entirely closed during the Khmer Rouge from 1975 to 1979.

In 1980, it was reopened with the new name of Institute of Agricultural Education to educate government staff to work in fields such as forestry, animal production, veterinary medicine, crop production, and agricultural machinery. In 1984, it became known as Institute of Agricultural Technology. It offered bachelor's degrees in Agronomy, Animal Science and Veterinary Medicine, Agricultural Engineering, Forestry and Fishery. Obtaining assistance from abroad, professors were from Soviet Union so all lectures were taught in Russian. In 1990, the support from the Soviet Union ended so the curriculum was converted to Khmer language.

In 1994, it officially changed the name to Royal University of Agriculture. After that, other bachelor's degree programs were introduced. In 2002, graduate degree programs in agricultural science-related majors were launched.

RUA is accredited by the Ministry of Agriculture, Forestry and Fisheries, and Ministry of Education, Youth and Sport. RUA offers bachelor's, masters and doctorate degrees. It is a leading contributor to Cambodia's human resources in the fields of agriculture and rural development.

Academics
The Royal University of Agriculture comprises nine faculties, a school, and four research centers:
 Department of Foundation Year
 Faculty of Agronomy
 Faculty of Animal Science 
 Faculty of Veterinary Medicine
 Faculty of Forestry
 Faculty of Fisheries
 Faculty of Agricultural Engineering
 Faculty of Agricultural Economics and Rural Development
 Faculty of Agro-Industry
 Faculty of Land Management and Land Administration
 Faculty of Rubber Sciences
 Graduate School
 Hun Sen Research Center
 IT Centre 
 Language Centre
 Center for Sustainable Agriculture
 Center for Agricultural and Environmental Studies
 Center for Livestock Development Studies
 Ecosystem Services and Land Use (ECOLAND) research center

See also
 Agriculture in Cambodia
 Education in Cambodia
 Ministry of Agriculture, Forestry and Fisheries, Cambodia

References

External links
 Royal University of Agriculture official site
 Ministry of Agriculture, Forestry, and Fisheries

Agriculture in Cambodia
Universities in Cambodia
Government of Cambodia
Agricultural universities and colleges
Fisheries and aquaculture research institutes
Forestry education
Educational institutions established in 1964
Education in Phnom Penh
1964 establishments in Cambodia